The orange-tailed snake-eyed skink (Austroablepharus  naranjicauda) is a species of skink, a lizard in the family Scincidae. The species is endemic to the Northern Territory in Australia.

References

Skinks of Australia
Reptiles described in 2004
Austroablepharus
Taxobox binomials not recognized by IUCN